Adamo Gentile (1615 – November 1662) was a Roman Catholic prelate who served as Bishop of Lipari (1660–1662).

Biography
Adamo Gentile was born in Caserta, Italy in 1615. On 15 November 1660, he was appointed during the papacy of Pope Gregory XIII as Bishop of Lipari.
On 21 November 1660, he was consecrated bishop by Antonio Barberini, Archbishop of Reims, with Marco Antonio Bottoni, Titular Bishop of Coronea, and Carlo Fabrizio Giustiniani, Bishop of Accia and Mariana, serving as co-consecrators. 
He served as Bishop of Lipari until his death in November 1662.

References

External links and additional sources
 (for Chronology of Bishops) 
 (for Chronology of Bishops) 

17th-century Italian Roman Catholic bishops
Bishops appointed by Pope Gregory XIII
1615 births
1662 deaths